This article displays the rosters for the participating teams at the 1995 Tournament of the Americas played in Neuquén and Tucumán, Argentina from August 15 to August 27, 1995.

Group A

Barbados

4 Cosmo Edwards
5 Sydney Rowe
6 Dwight Rouse
7 Andrew Harvey
8 Adrian Stewart
9 Hallam Stuart
10 Victor Payne
11 Nigel Lloyd
12 Michael Butcher
13 Charles Hill
14 Andrew Alleyn
15 James Phillips
Head coach:  William Harper

Canada

4 Joey Vickery
5 Sherman Hamilton
6 Phil Dixon
7 Steve Nash
8 William Njoku
9 Michael Meeks
10 Kory Hallas
11 Dwight Walton
12 Martin Keane
13 Bobby Allen
14 Greg Wiltjer
15 Wayne Yearwood
Head coach: / Steve Konchalski

Cuba

4 Ángel Caballero
5 Yudi Abreu
6 Pedro Cobarrubia
7 Roberto Simón
8 José Luis Díaz
9 Roberto Amaro
10 Leonardo Pérez
11 Lazaro Borrell
12 Leopoldo Vázquez
13 Francisco Cisneros
14 Radbel Hechevarría
15 Ruperto Herrera García
Head coach:  Miguel Calderón Gómez

Dominican Republic

4 Derek Baker
5 Domingo Aquino
6 Soterio Ramírez
7 Carlos Payano
8 Ricardo Vásquez
9 Víctor Chacón
10 Rafael Nova
11 Carlos Martínez
12 Tito Horford
13 Felipe López
14 José Vargas
15 Franklin Western
Head coach:  Osiris Duquela

Puerto Rico

4 José Ortiz
5 Joël Curbelo
6 Pablo Alicea
7 Richard Soto
8 Jerome Mincy
9 Eddie Rivera
10 José Nieves
11 Ramón Rivas
12 Rolando Hourruitiner
13 Eugenio Soto
14 Francisco de León
15 Georgie Torres
Head coach:  Carlos Morales

Group B

Argentina

4 Marcelo Nicola
5 Daniel Farabello
6 Luis Villar
7 Esteban de la Fuente
8 Ernesto Michel
9 Marcelo Milanesio
10 Juan Espil
11 Diego Osella
12 Fabricio Oberto
13 Jorge Racca
14 Esteban Pérez
15 Rubén Wolkowyski
Head coach:  Guillermo Vecchio

Bahamas

Neville Adderley
Locksley Collie 
Scott Forbes
Vincent Knowles
Shawn Merritt
Marcus Moncur 
Gibbiarra Outten 
Ricardo Pierre 
Shane Taylor 
Michael Wilson 
Head coach:  Gladstone McPhee

Brazil

4 Chuí
5 Ratto
6 Caio
7 Pipoka
8 Ferreira
9 Márcio
10 Maury
11 Minuci
12 Josuel
13 Rogério
14 Oscar
15 Israel
Head coach:  Ary Ventura Vidal

Uruguay

4 Juliano Rivera
5 Diego Losada
6 Luis Pierri
7 Enrique Cativelli
8 Alain Mayor
9 Óscar Moglia
10 Marcelo Capalbo
11 Gonzalo Caneiro
12 Gustavo Szczygielski
13 Luis Silveira
14 Marcel Bouzout
15 Jeff Granger
Head coach:  Víctor Hugo Berardi

Venezuela

4 Víctor David Díaz
5 Diego Guevara
6 Armando Becker
7 Richard Lugo
8 José Ramos
9 José Echenique
10 Sam Shepherd
11 César Portillo
12 Miguel Yepez
13 Gabriel Estaba
14 Iván Olivares
15 Omar Walcott
Head coach:  Mike Davis

Bibliography

External links
1995 FIBA Americas Championship for Men at fiba.basketball

FIBA AmeriCup squads